Shigemori (written:  or ) is a Japanese surname. Notable people with the surname include:

, Japanese actress
, Japanese landscape architect

Shigemori (written:  or ) is also a masculine Japanese given name. Notable people with the name include:

, Japanese swimmer

See also
4376 Shigemori, a main-belt asteroid

Japanese-language surnames
Japanese masculine given names